Japanese Homes and their Surroundings is a book by Edward S. Morse describing and illustrating the construction of Japanese homes. It was first published in 1886 after its author had spent three years in Japan studying and teaching zoology. It contains numerous drawings by Morse of various features of Japanese houses, including details of construction, a description of carpenter's tools, and a section on bonsai and flower arrangement.

References

See also
Edward S. Morse

External links

Japanese Homes and their Surroundings fulltext on Project Gutenberg
Japanese Homes and their Surroundings fulltext on Archive.org
Free fulltext online, and print copies 
Free fulltext, and print
1886 non-fiction books
Japanese home
Architecture books
Books about Japan